Calvello is an Italian surname. Notable people with the surname include:

Ann Calvello (1929–2006), American athlete
Jessica Calvello (born 1973), American voice actress and production assistant
Umberto Calvello (1897–1919), Italian pilot

Italian-language surnames